William Milne may refer to:

 William Milne (missionary) (1785–1822), British Protestant missionary to China
 Sir William Milne (politician) (1822–1895), South Australian wine merchant and politician
 William Milne (sport shooter) (born 1852), British sport shooter
 William J. Milne (educator) (1843–1914), American educator and administrator
 William Johnstone Milne (1892–1917), Canadian soldier
 William Milne (rugby union), Scottish rugby union player
 Billy Milne (1895–1975), Scottish footballer
 Willie Milne (1951–2023), Scottish golfer
 William Grant Milne (?–1866), Scottish botanist
 William Charles Milne, missionary to China
 Ross Milne (Canadian politician) (William Ross Milne), Canadian politician
 Sandy Milne (William Alexander Milne, born 1920), Scottish nationalist politician